NTTP may refer to:

 The ICAO code for Maupiti Airport
 Non-type template parameter, a type of parameter in a template (C++)